John Michael Broadbent, MW (2 May 1927 – 17 March 2020) was a British wine critic, writer and auctioneer in a capacity as a Master of Wine. He was an authority on wine tasting and old wines.

Career
Broadbent was born in Yorkshire. He was educated at Oundle School and trained as an architect but changed career, in 1952, at the age of twenty-five, and entered the wine trade first with Layton's, next with the West End Wine merchants, Saccone and Speed, and, from 1955 with Harvey's of Bristol. In 1960, he received the qualification of Master of Wine.

In 1966, he resigned as Sales Director to start wine auctions at the London auction house Christie's which would lead him to trade in and taste a greater number of fine and rare wines than anyone else in the world. His tasting notes are estimated to number over 90,000 in more than 140 notebooks. 

Until 1992, he was the senior director of Christie's wine department, and he remained a senior consultant with the firm until 2009. Journalist Harry Eyres, who worked as a junior expert at Christie's, wrote that Broadbent "created a small niche of glamour for himself as a jet-setting wine celebrity, while everybody else in the office toiled in near Dickensian conditions".

As a wine writer, Broadbent was noted for publications of his records from a life of tasting wine. The Great Vintage Wine Book is a reference work with tasting notes from more than 6,000 wines dating back to the 17th century. In addition to authoring several wine books, he was a regular contributor to the wine magazines Vinum and Falstaff , and wrote monthly for Decanter since its inception in 1975. Broadbent lectured on the subject since the mid-1950s. Broadbent awarded a wine up to five stars, a system unlike the numerical score of the American wine critic Robert Parker.

In 1979, Broadbent was appointed Chevalier of the Ordre national du Mérite, as well as an honorary member of the Académie du Vin de Bordeaux and numerous other French wine associations. Among other positions held, Broadbent was Chairman of The Institute of Masters of Wine in 1970, Master of the Worshipful Company of Distillers, president of The International Wine and Food Society in 1986, president of the Wine & Spirit Education Trust (WSET) 2007–2009 and Chairman of The Wine & Spirit Trades' Benevolent Society in 1991. He also stood as Sheriff of the City of London in 1993. 

In 2006, he participated as a judge in the 30th anniversary repetition of the original "Judgment of Paris" wine tasting competition.

Personal life
Michael Broadbent was widowed by his first wife, Daphne Broadbent (1931–2015). Their son, Bartholomew Broadbent, is a wine importer in the United States who also makes Port, Madeira and Vinho Verde in Portugal and was a 50% owner of Dragon's Hollow winery in China. Michael Broadbent's daughter, Emma Louise Arbuthnot, Baroness Arbuthnot of Edrom DBE, is the Chief Magistrate in England & Wales, married to The Rt Hon The Lord Arbuthnot of Edrom, James Arbuthnot, MP.

On 25 April 2019, in London, he married Valerie Smallwood, widow of Simon Smallwood, MW. Michael Broadbent died on 17 March 2020, in Berkshire, aged 92.

Controversy

Broadbent was also among the wine industry experts  whose association with alleged wine forger Hardy Rodenstock during the 1980s led to some embarrassment. 

In July 2009, it was announced that Broadbent would sue Random House, the publishers of The Billionaire's Vinegar by Benjamin Wallace, an account of the "Jefferson bottles affair" and its court cases, for defamation of character, on claims that the book asserts Broadbent invented an auction bid and contains references to him colluding with Rodenstock. The suit was filed in the United Kingdom, and Random House initially stated it did not believe it had defamed Broadbent and would defend the lawsuit.

In October 2009, Random House accepted that the allegations in the book were without foundation, removed the book from sale in the UK, made a full apology and paid Broadbent an undisclosed sum in damages. 

It was also reported that Wallace was not a party to the lawsuit or settlement, that Random House would be making no changes to the book, and that it would continue to publish the book in all territories outside the jurisdiction of the UK.

Bibliography

Guidance in the Techniques of Tasting (Harvey's of Bristol circa 1964)
Guidance in the Techniques of Tasting (Brown & Prank 1966)
Wine Tasting (1968-, 13 editions, translated into 8 foreign languages various publishers)
Wine Tasting, Enjoying, Understanding (1977)
Michael Broadbent's Pocket Guide to Wine Tasting (1979-, 7 editions Mitchell Beazley)
The Great Vintage Wine Book (UK and US 1980, 1981; also in Dutch and German)
The Complete Wine Taster & Cellarman (1984 Mitchell Beazley)
The Great Vintage Wine Book II (UK and US 1991)
Pocket Guide to Wine Vintages (1992, 1995, 2000)
The Bordeaux Wine Atlas and Encyclopedia of Chateaux co-authored with Hubrecht Duijker (1997 in English, French, Dutch and German)
Weine, prufen, kennen, geniessen (1997)Meine Lieblingsweine (Falken 1997)Die Weine der Neuen Welt (Falken 1998)Michael Broadbent's Wine Vintages (Mitchell Beazley 1998, 2003)Vintage Wine (Webster's/Little Brown UK, Harcourt US 2002, 2003-)Michael Broadbent's Wine Tasting (Mitchell Beazley Wine Guides 2000, 2003)Grosse Weine (Hallwag 2004)Michael Broadbent's Pocket Vintage Wine Companion (Anova 2007)

 See also 
List of wine personalities

External links
 

References

 Fabricant, Florence. The New York Times (December 18, 2002) A Wine Expert, 75, Passes the Test of Time
 Checkland, Sarah Jane. "Michael Broadbent", The Times'' (of London), April 30, 1993.

Footnotes

1927 births
2020 deaths
Wine critics
Masters of Wine
James Beard Foundation Award winners
People educated at Oundle School